Reginald Dennis Odell II (born September 28, 1980) is a writer, actor, comedic impersonator and look-alike of former U.S. President Barack Obama.

Reggie first made international headlines due to the controversy surrounding his performance at the 2011 Republican Leadership Conference, his occasional television appearances, and his activity on YouTube.

Early life and education
Brown is a native of Chicago, and was born Reginald Dennis Odell II in Maywood, Illinois, a suburb of Chicago. Like President Obama, Brown was born to a white mother and Black father. When Brown was five years old, his father and mother separated leaving her to raise Reggie and his older brother Lawrence on her own. When Brown was 9, his mother married his step father, Lawrence Brown. A year later his step father was diagnosed with Leukemia and began a 3-year battle with the disease. At the age of 13, his step father died, leaving Brown and his siblings to be raised by a single mother.

Brown attended the University of Illinois at Urbana–Champaign before dropping out of college to pursue a career in modeling. After joining Ford Model Management, he enrolled at The Acting Studios Chicago to take voice and acting classes.

Career

Local reporter
From 2006 to 2008, Brown worked as a blogger for WMAQ-TV's Street Team, where he covered local events. On September 9, 2008 Brown won an Emmy for 'Outstanding Achievement for Alternate Media/ New Media Interactivity' for his contributions to the coverage of Looptopia Live as part of the Street Team from the Chicago/Midwest Chapter of The National Academy of Television Arts And Sciences.

Obama impersonator
Brown claims that he first learned of his resemblance to Barack Obama at the age of 21, when Obama was still an Illinois state legislator. Brown's career as a professional impersonator was launched by a series of appearances on Fox Business Network, starting with a mock debate against Representative Ron Paul on Stossel. Brown subsequently appeared on Stossel for similar mock debates with Governor Gary Johnson and Herman Cain.

2011 Republican Leadership Conference controversy

Brown was the subject of a national controversy in June 2011 when, during a nationally televised performance by Brown at the Republican Leadership Conference, he was cut off mid-sentence by Conference Chairman Charlie Davis. Davis told CNN that he ended Brown's performance because the Conference has a "zero tolerance  for racially insensitive jokes." At first, Brown disputed the factual basis of Davis' statement, claiming that the performance was ended because Brown "was over  time by a few minutes." Later, Brown responded to the allegations of racism by stating that he "didn't hear any boos on any of the racial jokes" and that he felt "very safe delivering content like that" because he and the President are of a similar mixed racial background. "I wouldn't touch anything that I don't think the President would feel comfortable with or hasn't done himself. He is someone I respect. I want to make him happy," said Brown.

In the aftermath of the 2011 Republican Leadership Conference incident, Brown was invited by comedian Bill Maher to finish his act on HBO's Real Time with Bill Maher.

YouTube activity
Brown appeared in a viral YouTube parody of Psy's hit song Gangnam Style, entitled Obama Gangnam Style! The video received over 100 million views all over the world including over 30 million views from Twitter users in China, who reportedly believed that the real President Obama was responsible for the video. He also impersonated Obama in the ALS Ice Bucket Challenge, and in the 2016 U.S. presidential election he debuted a cross between Obama and Donald Trump, speaking popular Trump quotes, on CollegeHumor. He gave a similar performance in 2017 on Real Time with Bill Maher in a segment called "New Rule: What If Obama Said It?"

Filmography

Personal life
Brown currently resides in Los Angeles, California. When asked about his political affiliation by NewsOne, Brown refused to comment as to whether he is a Democrat or Republican, stating that he is simply an "entertainer."

Reggie is the founder of Outsmart Racism, a non profit organization (Pending) established to reverse the teachings of racism and put an end to it.

References

External links

1980 births
Male actors from Chicago
African-American male comedians
American male comedians
American impressionists (entertainers)
Living people
University of Illinois Urbana-Champaign alumni
Comedians from Illinois
21st-century American comedians
21st-century African-American people
20th-century African-American people
Barack Obama